Hong Kong Figure Skating Championships is a Hong Kong national figure skating championships organized by the Hong Kong Skating Union and held in the ice rink in Festival Walk. Competitions in the senior, junior and novice-level are contested in the men's single and women's single disciplines, sometimes pairs skating and ice dancing would be contested. The championships is part of the Hong Kong Figure Skating And Short Track Speed Skating Championships, where short-track speed skating competitions are also contested.

Medalists

Senior-level

Men

Women

Pairs (only contested in 2014)

Junior-level

Men

Women

Pairs (only contested in 2013)

Ice Dance (only contested in 2017)

Novice-level (2017 – now)

Advanced Novice Boys

Intermediate Novice Boys

Basic Novice Boys

Advanced Novice Girls

Intermediate Novice Girls

Basic Novice Girls

Novice-level (2008–2016)

Boys

Girls

Ice dance (only contested in 2016)

References

Figure skating national championships
Figure skating in Hong Kong